Alumina Limited is an Australian holding company. Spun off from Western Mining Corporation in 2002, its sole asset is a 40% shareholding in Alcoa World Alumina & Chemicals.

History
Alumina was founded in December 2002 when Western Mining Corporation spun off its aluminium and bauxite assets.

Alumina's only business activity is as the owner of a 40% share in Alcoa World Alumina & Chemicals (AWAC), a joint venture with Alcoa. 
AWAC owns two bauxite mines and three refineries (to extract aluminium oxide from bauxite) in Western Australia and owns a smelter (to extract pure aluminium metal) and has a 55% interest in the Portland aluminium smelter. AWAC also operates and has interests in Brazil, Guinea, Saudi Arabia and Spain.

In 2016, Alumina Limited achieved great short term authority over its interest in AWAC with more influence over a broader suite of operational and investment decisions.

Having been a dual-listed company with shares on both the Australian Securities Exchange (ASX) and New York Stock Exchange (NYSE), in February 2014 Alumina delisted from the NYSE, consolidating on the ASX.

References

External links
Company website

Aluminium companies of Australia
Companies based in Melbourne
Companies formerly listed on the New York Stock Exchange
Companies listed on the Australian Securities Exchange
Dual-listed companies
Holding companies of Australia
Non-renewable resource companies established in 2002
2002 establishments in Australia